Transitions is a collection of demo songs that eventually became the bulk of the self-titled debut album by progressive metal band Aghora, released in March, 2006.

Track listing
 "Satya" - 5:25
 "Frames" - 5:06
 "Kali Yuga" - 5:46
 "Existence" - 3:45
 "Transfiguration" - 4:17
 "Mind's Reality" - 4:55
 "Immortal Bliss" - 4:15

Credits
Danishta Rivero — vocals
Santiago Dobles — lead guitar, coral sitar, programming
Charlie Ekendahl — rhythm guitar
Andy Deluca — bass guitar
Sean Reinert — drums, tabla, percussion

2006 compilation albums
Progressive metal compilation albums
Aghora (band) albums